Cedar Point is an unincorporated community in Goochland County, Virginia, United States. The Lock-Keeper's House, which is listed on the National Register of Historic Places, is located near Cedar Point.

References

Unincorporated communities in Goochland County, Virginia
Unincorporated communities in Virginia